The Riverbank Arena was a stadium in the Olympic Park, in Hackney Wick, London, United Kingdom, containing a water-based astroturf.

History
The Riverbank Arena was built with two venues for field-hockey competition at the 2012 Summer Olympics with capacities of 15,000 and 5,000, respectively, and venues for the football 7-a-side and football 5-a-side competitions at the 2012 Summer Paralympics.

The budget for the stadium was £19 million. Plans were made to scale down the venue after the Olympics, converting it into a 5,000-seat arena and a training pitch in Eton Manor, a sport and leisure venue in Leyton, Waltham Forest. In January 2011, Leyton Orient F.C. expressed an interest in moving into the stadium after the games.

In May 2012, it opened with a test event, a men's and women's invitational hockey tournament.

Riverbank Arena was dismantled following the conclusion of the 2012 Games. The Eton Manor venue on the Olympic Park, now known as the Lee Valley Hockey and Tennis Centre, hosted the 2015 EuroHockey Nations Championships. The facility reopened in June 2014 and is the current ground of Wapping Hockey Club.

References

External links

 London 2012 Olympics profile

2012 establishments in England
Venues of the 2012 Summer Olympics
Field hockey venues in England
Olympic field hockey venues
Queen Elizabeth Olympic Park
Sport in the London Borough of Newham
Sports venues completed in 2012
Sports venues in London
2012 Summer Paralympic venues
Hackney Wick